WSFW (1110 kHz) is an AM radio station broadcasting a Christian talk and teaching radio format. Licensed to Seneca Falls, New York, United States, the station is currently an owned-and-operated station of CSN International.  Some of the national religious leaders heard on WSFW include Adrian Rogers, David Jeremiah and James Dobson.

Because AM 1110 is a clear channel frequency reserved for Class A stations WBT Charlotte and KFAB Omaha, WSFW is a daytimer and must go off the air at sunset to avoid interference.  Programming is heard around the clock over a 200-watt FM translator, W296DI on 107.1 MHz.

History
On October 1, 1968, WSFW signed on the air.  It was owned by the Waterfalls Broadcasting Company.  One month later, it added an FM counterpart, 99.3 WSFW-FM (now WFLK).  The two stations simulcast a full service middle of the road format of popular music, news and sports.

In 2007, WSFW dropped its "Finger Lakes News-Talk Network" simulcast with WGVA Geneva, WCGR Canadaigua and WAUB Auburn, New York, then flipped to a travelers information format.

WSFW was sold to Calvary Chapel Twin Falls on November 12, 2009. The assignment of license was approved by the Federal Communications Commission (FCC) on January 12, 2010.  At this point, WSFW adopted its current Christian talk and teaching format, supplied by CSN International.

References

External links
CSN Radio's website
WSFW's page on CSN Radio's website

Radio stations established in 1968
1968 establishments in New York (state)
SFW
SFW